Olearia lehmanniana is a species of flowering plant in the family Asteraceae and is endemic to inland areas of the south-west of Western Australia. It is a shrub with scattered elliptic or linear leaves that are densely hairy on the lower surface, and pale mauve, daisy-like inflorescences.

Description
The upper surface of the leaves is more or less glabrous and the lower surface is densely hairy. Flowering occurs from February to April and the fruit is an orange-brown achene, the pappus with 28 to 30 long and 10 to 12 short bristles.

Taxonomy
This species was first formally described in 1845 by Joachim Steetz who gave it the name Eurybia lehmanniana in Johann Georg Christian Lehmann's Plantae Preissianae, from specimens collected near Perth in 1839. In 2008 Nicholas Sèan Lander changed the name to Olearia lehmanniana in the journal Nuytsia. The specific epithet (lehmanniana) honours Johann Georg Christian Lehmann.

Distribution and habitat
Olearia lehmanniana grows in a variety of habitats including swamps, heath woodland and forest in the Avon Wheatbelt, Geraldton Sandplains, Jarrah Forest, Mallee and Swan Coastal Plain biogeographic regions of south-western Western Australia.

Conservation status
This daisy bush is listed as "not threatened" by the Western Australian Government Department of Biodiversity, Conservation and Attractions.

References

lehmanniana
Flora of Western Australia
Plants described in 1845
Taxa named by Joachim Steetz